Middle Island is a small island, just  in area. It is the southernmost point of land in Canada, located at 41°41'N, 82°41"W (41.685,-82.684), or about 41.7 degrees north latitude. It lies in Lake Erie, just south of Pelee Island, and is part of Point Pelee National Park. It forms part of the province of Ontario.

The southernmost point of Middle Island is at a latitude of North 41°40'53", which is at a slightly lower latitude than the southernmost point in Michigan and slightly farther south than downtown Chicago. Twenty-seven U.S. states lie fully or partly north of this point, as do European cities such as Rome and Barcelona and Asian cities such as Sapporo. Thirteen states are entirely north of this latitude (Alaska, Washington, Oregon, Idaho, Montana, North Dakota, South Dakota, Minnesota, Wisconsin, Michigan, Vermont, New Hampshire, and Maine). California, Nevada, and Utah, albeit only their northernmost edge, are amongst the states that lie partially north of Middle Island, as their northern border is at the 42nd parallel north. Greece’s northernmost town, Ormenio, lies slightly north of Middle Island. In fact, only two European countries are located entirely south of Middle Island: Malta and Cyprus, both island countries located in the Mediterranean Sea.

Background
There are no permanent settlements on Middle Island, as the entire island is a conservation area.  The most common species are double-crested cormorants, though several others also nest there.  The birds are so plentiful that in May 2008, Parks Canada attempted to cull the number of cormorants from more than 4,000 nests to between 400 and 800. It once was the site of a lighthouse, built in 1872 but which fell into disuse by 1918.

The  pyramidal square tower burned sometime afterward, but its stone foundation is visible.  Located in Canadian waters, and hence indisputably under Canadian sovereignty, the island was privately owned for years by various U.S. owners. Subsequently, Middle Island was purchased in 1999 by the Nature Conservancy of Canada, and then donated to the Canadian national park system on September 6, 2000.

Archaeological evidence from a study done in 1982 suggests human occupation dating from 1000 to 1500 A.D., with one site containing remains that may date to 500 B.C. Others claim that the island has seen inhabitation for more than 10,000 years. Despite early rumours of burial mounds, none were found.

The island is part of an archipelago across western Lake Erie, providing a natural migratory corridor for birds and other animals. It has also seen human migrations, mainly from the U.S. northward in the 19th century, including escaped slaves, prisoners of war and army deserters from the U.S. Civil War seeking asylum in mainland Ontario.

Throughout the later decades of the 19th century, parts of Middle Island were used for growing grapes to be used in the production of wine, as was being done on Pelee Island.

During Prohibition, the island was a way station for alcohol en route to the United States on the south shore of Lake Erie. Gangster Joe Roscoe acquired part of the island and built a seven-bedroom "clubhouse" that became the centre of rum-running activity. The hotel offered electricity, fireplaces, and a large screened-in porch with views of the lake. The basement held a casino, carved out of solid bedrock.

In the years after 1933, after the ratification of the Twenty-first Amendment to the United States Constitution resulted in the repeal of the Volstead Act, the hotel drew as many as 200 visitors a day in peak season. Its kitchen became known for pheasant dinners.

Likely prior to the 1950s, there was an airstrip of about 275 metres (900 feet) in length. The runway began and ended in water, and is now choked with vegetation.

There was at one time a stately mansion on the island, rumoured to be a brothel some time after Prohibition. Only a remnant of the foundation remains.

When purchased in 1999 by the Nature Conservancy of Canada, the island had no physical improvements and had essentially become a nature preserve over the previous ten years, hosting the occasional scientific visit, and curious boaters. Although part of Point Pelee National Park, Middle Island is not officially open to visitors.

Interest in preserving the island prompted a 1982 study by Parks Canada, which recommended naming it a national natural landmark. Its ecological, historical, and aesthetic value led Essex County to include it on its list of Environmentally Sensitive Areas and an Area of Natural and Scientific Interest. A conservation group, Carolinian Canada Coalition, named Middle Island one of 38 critical unprotected sites in its effort to preserve remnants of Ontario's southern forests.

References

External links

Middle Island Joins Point Pelee National Park (Parks Canada news release)
Middle Island's Hidden Treasures
 

Landforms of Essex County, Ontario
Uninhabited islands of Ontario
Islands of Lake Erie in Ontario
Areas of Natural and Scientific Interest
Extreme points of Canada